This is a list of singles that charted in the top ten of the Billboard Hot 100, an all-genre singles chart, in 2012.

Sixty-two singles charted in the top ten during the year. Fifty acts scored a top-ten hit, with seventeen achieving their first hits as lead or featured artists. Rapper Nicki Minaj garnered five top-ten singles during the year, the most of any artist, while Gotye's "Somebody That I Used to Know" was the longest-running top-ten single of the year, spending twenty-four weeks in the tier.

Following her death on February 11, 2012, singer Whitney Houston placed three re-entries in the top fifty of the Hot 100 on the week ending February 25, 2012, led by "I Will Always Love You" at number seven. Such re-entries of catalog songs are rare as Billboard maintains a policy deeming songs ineligible to chart due to moving to the recurrent list after twenty weeks if ranking below number fifty. After Houston's death, however, an adjustment in this policy allowed catalog songs to re-enter the chart's upper half if sales and airplay activity merit inclusion, as was the case with "I Will Always Love You", which surged after the singer's death in digital sales by 6,723% and in airplay by 915% from the previous week.

Phillip Phillips's "Home" became the first song to enter the top ten in separate chart runs in a single calendar year when it re-entered on the weeks ending August 18, 2012 and December 8, 2012 . The song debuted at number ten on the week ending June 9, 2012 and spent a sole week in the top ten before falling off the chart three weeks later.

Top-ten singles
Key
 – indicates single's top 10 entry was also its Hot 100 debut
 – indicates best performing song of the year
(#) – 2012 year-end top 10 single position and rank

α "I Will Always Love You" originally entered the top ten and peaked at number one on the week ending November 28, 1992, spending 16 weeks in the tier in its first chart run. See List of Billboard Hot 100 top 10 singles in 1992 for more. The above entry for the single reflects its run in 2012 only.

2011 peaks

2013 peaks

Notes
The single re-entered the top ten on the week ending January 7, 2012.
The single re-entered the top ten on the week ending January 14, 2012.
The single re-entered the top ten on the week ending January 28, 2012.
The single re-entered the top ten on the week ending February 11, 2012.
The single re-entered the top ten on the week ending February 18, 2012.
The single re-entered the top ten on the week ending February 25, 2012.
The single re-entered the top ten on the week ending March 3, 2012.
The single re-entered the top ten on the week ending March 10, 2012.
The single re-entered the top ten on the week ending March 24, 2012.
The single re-entered the top ten on the week ending August 18, 2012.
The single re-entered the top ten on the week ending September 22, 2012.
The single re-entered the top ten on the week ending October 27, 2012.
The single re-entered the top ten on the week ending November 17, 2012.
The single re-entered the top ten on the week ending December 8, 2012.
The single re-entered the top ten on the week ending December 29, 2012.

See also
2012 in American music
List of Billboard Hot 100 number-one singles of 2012
Billboard Year-End Hot 100 singles of 2012
List of Billboard Hot 100 top 10 singles in 2011

References

General sources

Additional information obtained can be verified within Billboard's online archive services and print editions of the magazine.

External links
Billboard.com
Billboard.biz
The Billboard Hot 100 top ten

United States Hot 100 Top Ten Singles
2012